Stéphane Ostrowski (born 17 March 1962) is a retired French professional basketball player. At a height of 6 ft 8  in (2.05 m) tall, he played at the power forward position. He is widely considered to be one of the major figures of French basketball history, and he was among the 105 player nominees for the 50 Greatest EuroLeague Contributors list.

Professional career
Ostrowski led CSP Limoges to the FIBA Saporta Cup title in 1988, and to the FIBA Korać Cup final in 1987. He also played at the 1990 EuroLeague Final Four. He reached another European Cup final in 2001, when he contributed to Élan Sportif Chalonnais' great run in the Saporta Cup.

National team career
Ostrowski was a regular member of the senior French national team. He reached the EuroBasket semifinals in 1991, finishing the tournament in fourth place.

References

External links
Profile on fibaeurope.com
Player nominees for the EuroLeague's 50 Greatest Contributors

1962 births
Living people
Basketball players at the 1984 Summer Olympics
Cholet Basket players
Élan Chalon players
French basketball coaches
French men's basketball players
French people of Polish descent
Le Mans Sarthe Basket players
Limoges CSP players
Olympic basketball players of France
Olympique Antibes basketball players
Power forwards (basketball)
1986 FIBA World Championship players
Mediterranean Games medalists in basketball
Mediterranean Games bronze medalists for France
Competitors at the 1993 Mediterranean Games
People from Bron
Sportspeople from Lyon Metropolis